Keith Detelj (born July 22, 1985) is a retired American soccer player.

Career
Detelj played in the USL PDL between 2009 and 2012 with clubs such as Fort Wayne Fever, Westchester Flames and Long Island Roughriders, before signing his first professional contract with USL Pro club Dayton Dutch Lions on August 15, 2014.

References

1985 births
Living people
American soccer players
Fort Wayne Fever players
Westchester Flames players
Long Island Rough Riders players
Dayton Dutch Lions players
New York Pancyprian-Freedoms players
Association football forwards
Soccer players from New York (state)
USL League Two players
USL Championship players
Cosmopolitan Soccer League players
People from Ronkonkoma, New York
Marist Red Foxes men's lacrosse players
Marist Red Foxes men's soccer players
New Paltz Hawks women's lacrosse coaches
Lacrosse players from New York (state)